1,3-Diazepine is a diazepine. It is a scaffold found in some natural products and drugs. It is found in the drugs pentostatin and avibactam. Coformycin is a naturally occurring antibiotic.

References

Diazepines